Cardamine rotundifolia, also known as American bittercress or mountain bittercress, is a perennial herbaceous brassica native to eastern North America. It was first described by André Michaux in his publication Flora Boreali-Americana (1803).

References

rotundifolia